Azhagiya Theeye is a 2004 Indian Tamil-language romantic comedy film written and directed by Radha Mohan that stars Prasanna and Navya Nair. The film was produced by Prakash Raj, who also played a significant character in the film, while Ramesh Vinayagam composed the music. It released to generally positive reviews. The film's name is inspired by the song of the same name from Minnale (2001). The movie was remade in Telugu in 2006 as Happy.

Plot
The story revolves around Chandran (Prasanna) is approached by a girl Nandhini (Navya Nair) to break her proposed marriage with a software engineer Aravind (Prakash Raj) from the U.S. She is forced by her father who is a thug (Pyramid Natarajan) to marry this guy. Later Chandran hatches a plan by which he meets Aravind at a restaurant and tells him that Nandhini is madly in love with him. And the big twist is that Aravind does not walk away and instead stays back to see that the ‘love birds’ get united which upsets Chandran's plans and his life. He is forced to marry Nandhini at a registrar office and she is thrown out of her house. Aravind arranges a flat for them and leaves for the U.S. How the couple starts liking each other after a series of incidents forms the rest of the love story.

Cast

 Prasanna as Chandran
 Navya Nair as Nandhini
 Prakash Raj as Aravind Singh
 Elango Kumaravel as Gopi (Chithappa)
 Jayavarma as Moorthy
 Bala as Bala
 M. S. Bhaskar as Annachi
 Devadarshini as Sandhya
 Pyramid Natarajan as Nandhini's father
 Periyar Dasan
 Abbas (special appearance - "Dil Mera Loot Liya")
 Rambha (special appearance - "Dil Mera Loot Liya")

Production
Radha Mohan began work on his first film was Smile Please in 1996, starring Prakash Raj in the lead role, but financial restraints meant that the film was later shelved. Prakash Raj chose to produce a film with Radha Mohan and announced the project in July 2003 under the title of Koothupattarai, which developed alongside Prakash Raj's other production Naam (2003). Navya Nair signed on to appear in the film during September 2003, which by then had been briefly titled Ellame Drama Thaan.

Soundtrack 
The soundtrack for this film was composed by Ramesh Vinayakam.

Reception
The Hindu wrote "AMIDST RUN of the mill love themes and implausible action, Duet Movies' "Azhagiya Theeyae ... " comes as a whiff of fresh air. A simple storyline neatly narrated, the film is ably backed by Viji's dialogue. The comic digs, light-hearted barbs and humorous verbal exchanges in this breezy romantic story, keep your spirits enlivened." Sify wrote "On the whole Azhagiya Theeye is good fun while it lasts." Visual Dasan of Kalki praised the film and director for healthy humour, humorous dialogues and for making a film different from commercial films.

References

External links

2004 films
2000s Tamil-language films
Tamil films remade in other languages
Indian romantic comedy-drama films
2004 romantic comedy-drama films
Films about filmmaking
Films about film directors and producers
Films scored by Ramesh Vinayakam
2004 directorial debut films
Films directed by Radha Mohan